The 2005 Nagoya marathon was held on March 13, 2005. It was the 26th edition of the Nagoya Women's Marathon. The Japanese Yumiko Hara finished first with a time of 2:24.19. Only females were allowed to take part in the competition.

References 

Marathons in Japan
Nagoya